Sir Percival Halse Rogers  (1 August 1883 – 7 October 1945) was an Australian jurist and university chancellor.

Early life
Halse Rogers was born in Gunnedah, New South Wales, the second son of a Methodist minister and was educated at Newington College (1896-1901). He became a resident of St Andrew's College, at the University of Sydney and graduated BA in 1905. Outstanding as a student and sportsman he was the second Rhodes scholar from New South Wales and attended Worcester College, Oxford, graduating BCL in 1908.

Legal career
On his return to Sydney, Halse Rogers became a temporary clerk in the Crown Law Office and then Judge's associate to New South Wales Chief Justice Sir William Cullen. Halse Rogers was admitted to the New South Wales Bar in 1911 and married later that year. From 1919 he lectured part-time on legal interpretation at the University of Sydney and in 1926 was commissioned KC. In 1928 he was appointed as a judge of the Supreme Court of New South Wales sitting in the common law jurisdiction and presiding in the commercial cases. He served four times as a royal commissioner, conducting celebrated inquiries into greyhound-racing licences and fruit machines 1932 and Commonwealth secret funds 1941.

Community service
Halse Rogers was a director of Sydney Hospital and a member of the executive committee of the Fairbridge Farm Schools of New South Wales. A fellow of the senate of the University of Sydney from 1929, he was deputy chancellor from 1934 until elected chancellor in 1936. He was appointed KBE in 1939. Placed in an embarrassing position as chancellor when promised senate support was withheld, he resigned.

Personal life
Halse Rogers married Mabel Trevor Jones and had two daughters. In 1936, the Halse Rogers went on a 3-year trip to Europe, the UK, and the United States. In Germany, they attended the 1936 Berlin Olympics. Daughter Judith, an actress, later became a newsreader for the ABC during World War II.

Halse Rogers died of a heart attack on Sunday, 7 October 1945 in Darling Point.

References

Bibliography
 J. M. Bennett, 'Rogers, Sir Percival Halse (1883 - 1945)', Australian Dictionary of Biography, Volume 11, Melbourne University Press, 1988, pp 442–443.

External links
 University of Sydney Senate History [Wayback Machine] 
 Sir Percival Halse Rogers, Woollahra Municipal Council 

1883 births
1945 deaths
Australian Rhodes Scholars
Australian Knights Commander of the Order of the British Empire
Judges of the Supreme Court of New South Wales
People educated at Newington College
Alumni of Worcester College, Oxford
Chancellors of the University of Sydney